Whangārei Central is the central suburb and business district of Whangārei, in the Northland Region of New Zealand's North Island. It includes the Whangārei Town Basin.

It has traditionally been the main commercial centre of Northland. As of 2017, approximately 39% of the 1404 businesses were commercial and professional services; 19% were retail and food businesses.

In March 2019, Whangarei District Council decided to build a new precinct on the north-western side of the CBD.

Demographics

Whangarei Central had a population of 954 at the 2018 New Zealand census, an increase of 195 people (25.7%) since the 2013 census, and an increase of 60 people (6.7%) since the 2006 census. There were 375 households, comprising 483 males and 471 females, giving a sex ratio of 1.03 males per female. The median age was 46.1 years (compared with 37.4 years nationally), with 129 people (13.5%) aged under 15 years, 168 (17.6%) aged 15 to 29, 477 (50.0%) aged 30 to 64, and 177 (18.6%) aged 65 or older.

Ethnicities were 61.3% European/Pākehā, 28.0% Māori, 6.0% Pacific peoples, 14.5% Asian, and 2.2% other ethnicities. People may identify with more than one ethnicity.

The percentage of people born overseas was 29.2, compared with 27.1% nationally.

Although some people chose not to answer the census's question about religious affiliation, 49.1% had no religion, 33.6% were Christian, 2.5% had Māori religious beliefs, 1.6% were Hindu, 2.8% were Muslim, 2.5% were Buddhist and 4.1% had other religions.

Of those at least 15 years old, 147 (17.8%) people had a bachelor's or higher degree, and 153 (18.5%) people had no formal qualifications. The median income was $23,200, compared with $31,800 nationally. 87 people (10.5%) earned over $70,000 compared to 17.2% nationally. The employment status of those at least 15 was that 339 (41.1%) people were employed full-time, 123 (14.9%) were part-time, and 45 (5.5%) were unemployed.

Features

Whangārei Central has several art galleries:

 Hundertwasser Arts Centre and Wairau Māori Art Gallery opened in 2022.

 Reyburn House Art Gallery opened in 1966.

 Whangārei Art Museum Te Manawa Toi opened in 1996.

References

Populated places in the Northland Region
Suburbs of Whangārei
Central business districts in New Zealand